Paras Kuhad is a Senior Advocate at the Supreme Court of India. In 2012, he was appointed as Additional Solicitor General of India, and worked as such till May 2014. He is also the father of famed singer Prateek Kuhad and the founder of Paras Kuhad & Associates law firm in 1989. Founder of Hemant Sahai Associates, Hemant Sahai once praised Paras as a wonderful professional and a human being

References

20th-century Indian lawyers
Additional Solicitors General of India
Living people
Indian Senior Counsel
Year of birth missing (living people)